Ebiscothyris is a monotypic genus of brachiopods belonging to the family Terebratulidae. The only species is Ebiscothyris bellonensis.

References

Brachiopod genera
Terebratulida
Monotypic brachiopod genera